The Women's Marathon event at the 2000 Summer Olympics took place on 24 September 2000 in the streets of Sydney, Australia.

Medalists

Abbreviations
All times shown are in hours:minutes:seconds

Records

Startlist

Intermediates

Final ranking

References

External links
IAAF results. Retrieved 28 January 2007.

Sydney Women's Marathon

Marathon, women
Marathons at the Olympics
2000 marathons
2000 Summer Olympics
Summer Olympics marathon
Women's events at the 2000 Summer Olympics